Sir Harry Edward Spiller Cordeaux KCMG CB (15 November 1870 – 2 July 1943) was an Indian Army officer and colonial administrator who became in turn Governor of Uganda, Saint Helena and the Bahamas.

Birth and education

Cordeaux was born on 15 November 1870 in Poona, India. His father Edward Cordeaux was a judge in Bombay.
He was educated at Brighton College and Cheltenham College.
In 1888 he won a scholarship to St. John's College, Cambridge, graduating with a B.A. in 1892.

Early career

Cordeaux joined the Indian Staff Corps in 1895.
He was promoted to Lieutenant in 1896, Captain in 1903 and Major in 1912.
He entered the Bombay Political Department in 1898, and that year was appointed Assistant Resident at Berbera, on the Somali Coast.
Cordeaux was appointed Vice-Consul at Berbera on 15 October 1900, and upgraded to Consul on 15 November 1902, serving until 1906, during which he was also Deputy Commissioner of British Somaliland (1904-1906). He was appointed Commissioner and Commander-in-Chief of British Somaliland from 1906 to 1910.
He took a keen interest in the fauna of Somaliland.
He identified the small antelope Cordeaux's Dik-dik Madoqua (saltiana) cordeauxi, now usually seen as a subspecies of Salt's Dik-dik.

Colonial governor

Cordeaux was appointed Governor of Uganda (1910-1911).
He supervised construction of the railway from Jinja to Kakindu.
He was appointed Governor of St Helena (1911-1920) and Governor and Commander-in-Chief of the Bahama Islands (1920-1926).
In 1920 he laid the foundation stone of the Supreme Court of the Bahamas.
In 1923 concessions were granted to Sir Harry Cordeaux and Arthur Sands to cut the pine forest on New Providence.
They built a sawmill south of Gambier Village near Jack Pond, but the licence was never profitable and was relinquished in 1930.

During the period of Prohibition in the United States (1920-1933), there was a huge increase in exports of whiskey from Britain to the Bahamas. By February 1921, Cordeaux reported that there were thirty-one bonded warehouses in the island.
Revenue rose from 81,049 pounds in 1919 to 1,065,899 pounds in 1923, and remained above 500,000 per year until 1930.
Speaking in Montreal, Cordeaux said that the liquor traffic was the reason for the island's healthy economy, including the ability to finance a 250,000-pound improvement to the harbor in Nassau. This statement was widely circulated in the American press. The British took no measures to stop the trade.

He was appointed a Companion of the Order of St Michael and St George (CMG) in the 1902 Coronation Honours list on 26 June 1902, a Companion of the Order of the Bath (CB) in 1904 and knighted as a Knight Commander of the Order of St Michael and St George (KCMG) in 1921.
Cordeaux died on 2 July 1943.

Family
Cordeaux married Maud Wentworth-Fitzwilliam on 2 October 1912.

References

1870 births
1943 deaths
Alumni of St John's College, Cambridge
British governors of the Bahamas
Companions of the Order of the Bath
Governors of Saint Helena
Governors of Uganda
Governors of British Somaliland
Knights Commander of the Order of St Michael and St George
20th-century Bahamian people
20th-century British politicians
British colonial governors and administrators in Africa
British colonial governors and administrators in the Americas